Evarts can refer to:

People
 Edward Evarts (1926–1985), American neuroscientist
 Jeremiah Evarts (1781–1831), Christian missionary, reformer and activist for the rights of American Indians
 Maxwell Evarts (1862–1913), American lawyer and politician, son of William M. Evarts
 Milo Evarts (1913–1942), World War II United States Navy Cross recipient
 William M. Evarts (1818–1901), American lawyer and politician, United States Secretary of State, Attorney General and Senator from New York
 Evarts Worcester Farr (1840–1880), American politician
 Evarts Ambrose Graham (1883–1957), American academic, physician and surgeon
 Evarts Boutell Greene (1870–1947), American historian
 Evarts G. Loomis (1910–2003), homeopath, surgeon, author, lecturer
 Evarts Tracy (1868–1922), of the American architectural firm Tracy and Swartwout

Places
 Evarts, Alberta, Canada, an unincorporated community
 Evarts, Illinois, United States, an unincorporated community
 Evarts, Kentucky, United States, a home rule-class city in Harlan County

Ships
 Evarts-class destroyer escort
 USS Evarts (DE-5), lead ship of the class

Other uses
 Battle of Evarts, a mining labor conflict in Kentucky
 Evarts High School, Harlan County, Kentucky

See also
 Judiciary Act of 1891, also known as the Evarts Act, after its primary sponsor, Senator William M. Evarts
 Evart (disambiguation)